Igor Chetverik (born 2 June 1965) is a former Ukrainian professional footballer who played as a forward.

Career
Chetverik started his career with Desna Chernihiv, where he played 240 matches and served as captain between 1987 and 1994. He then jumped between several clubs, spending two spells with Dnipro Cherkasy before ending his career at Sirius Fotboll.

References

External links
 footballfacts.ru

1965 births
Living people
Footballers from Chernihiv
Soviet footballers
FC Desna Chernihiv players
FC Desna Chernihiv captains
FC Dnipro Cherkasy players
FC Fakel Varva players
IK Sirius Fotboll players
Ukrainian Second League players
Association football forwards
Ukrainian footballers
Ukrainian expatriate footballers
Expatriate footballers in Sweden
Ukrainian expatriate sportspeople in Sweden